Chavela at Carnegie Hall, also known as Chavela Live at Carnegie Hall, is a live album by Mexican singer Chavela Vargas. It was recorded live at Carnegie Hall in New York City on September 15, 2003. In 2019, it was selected by Mitú as one of the "Spanish-Language Albums Changed The Face And Feel Of The Music Industry".

Track listing
 Macorina
 Un Mundo Raro	
 Sombras	
 Se Me Hizo Facil	
 Soledad	
 Cruz de Olvido	
 El Andariego	
 Vamonos	
 La Noche de Mi Amor
 Las Simples Cosas
 Luz de Luna	
 Si No Te Vas
 La Llorona	
 En el Ultimo Trago	
 Volver, Volver
 La Churrasca	
 Hacia La Vida
 Introduction by Salma Hayek and Elliot Goldenthal

References

2003 albums
Chavela Vargas albums